Sonic the Hedgehog is a video game series. It is published by Sega, with entries developed by Sega, Sonic Team, Dimps, SIMS Co., Ltd., BioWare, and Sumo Digital. The series debuted in 1991 with the video game, Sonic the Hedgehog, released for the Mega Drive video game console (named Sega Genesis in North America). In its earliest history, most Sonic the Hedgehog games had been platform games released for Sega video game consoles and handheld game consoles (handhelds), dating from the Sega Genesis to the Sega Dreamcast. However, some of the original games were ported into versions on newer third-party home consoles and developed by various companies. As of March 2011, the series has collectively sold 89 million copies worldwide across both the platform games and spin-offs.

The most popular games in the franchise are platform games, although the series also includes other genres such as racing video games, fighting games, action-adventure games, role-playing video games, and sports games. Each game focuses on the titular protagonist Sonic the Hedgehog, an anthropomorphic blue hedgehog. It also features a large cast of other characters such as Doctor Ivo "Eggman" Robotnik, Miles "Tails" Prower, Knuckles the Echidna, Amy Rose, Shadow the Hedgehog, and the Chao creatures.

2D platformers

3D platformers

Sonic Riders Series

Sonic & Sega All-Stars Racing Series

Other Racing games

Sonic at the Olympic Games Series

Sonic Boom Series

Arcade games

Educational games

Sonic Cafe Games

Other spin-offs

Compilations

Cancelled games

See also

List of Sonic the Hedgehog characters

References 

 
Sonic the Hedgehog